Lassen is a Danish surname.

Lassen may also refer to:

People 
 Birger Stuevold Lassen (1927–2011)
 Cody Lassen
 Elna Lassen (1901–1930)
 Emil Lassen
 Flemming Lassen (1902–1984)
 Harald Lassen (born 1987)
 Jan Gerhard Lassen (born 1949)
 Jeane Lassen (born 1980)
 Matias Lassen (born 1996)
 Moira Lassen (born 1963)
 Stefan Lassen (born 1985)

Places
 Lassen, California, former name of Janesville, California
Lassen Community College, community college in Susanville, California
 Lassen County, in northeastern California
 Lassen Peak, volcano in the Cascade Range
Lassen National Forest in northeastern California  
 Lassen Volcanic National Park, US national park in northeastern California
Lassen Hotel (Wichita, Kansas), listed on the NRHP in Wichita, Kansas

Other
 USS Lassen (DDG-82), US Naval destroyer
USS Lassen (AE-3), US Naval destroyer
Lassen Fragment, parchment page from c. 1275. in the Royal Danish Library of Copenhagen
 USS Lassen
 Lassen State Highway
 Lassen Volcanic Center
 Lassen parsley
 Lassen sandverbena

See also
Larsen (disambiguation)
Larson (disambiguation)
Lassen Hotel (disambiguation)